The Socialist Party of Sri Lanka (SP) is a left-wing political party in Sri Lanka. Founded in 2006 as a split from the United Socialist Party (part of the Committee for a Workers' International), it was for a time associated with the League for the Fifth International until its expulsion in 2020 over a disagreement around electoral tactics. The party has members in several unions, including a health union.

Popular environmentalist and social activist Ajantha Perera was nominated as the party's presidential candidate for the 2019 Sri Lankan presidential election. She also became the only female presidential candidate to contest the 2019 elections and the first such instance since 1999. She later defected to the centre-right United National Party.

Electoral history

See also 
Sri Lanka leftist parties

References

External links
Declaration of Fraternal Relations
Details of SPSL-L5I relations

2006 establishments in Sri Lanka
Communist parties in Sri Lanka
League for the Fifth International
Political parties established in 2006
Trotskyist organisations in Sri Lanka